Produce Camp 2021 is a Chinese reality competition show and a spin-off of the television series Produce 101. A total of 90 trainees, aged 17–28 years old from various talent agencies, compete to debut in an 11-member international boy band, with members selected by online voting from the viewers. In addition to trainees from Mainland China, Taiwan, and Hong Kong, there are also foreign trainees from many different countries such as the United States, Japan, Thailand, Russia, Ukraine, and Cuba.

Contestants
The spelling of names in English are according to the official website. The Chinese contestants are presented in Eastern order (family name, given name), while the names of the foreign contestants are presented in Western order (given name, family name).

Color key

Evaluations

1st Evaluations (Episodes 3.1 & 3.2)

2nd Evaluations (Episodes 6.1 & 6.2) 

Note

 For Original Composition (Dance) Group, the trainees from 《Five C》 were the one who created an "original choreography" using the song 《Joker》 of Lay Zhang.

3rd Evaluations (Episodes 8)

Final Performance

Notes

References

 
Produce Camp 2021 contestants
Produce Camp 2021 contestants
Produce Camp 2021 contestants
Produce Camp 2021 contestants